Lorenzo Donà ( 1668–84) was a Venetian official, an officer that participated in the Cretan War (1645–69), and the provveditore of Venetian Dalmatia (fl. 1684), and eventually provveditore-generale during the Morean War (1684–99).

References

17th-century births
17th-century deaths
17th-century Italian politicians
Republic of Venice military personnel
Republic of Venice people of the Ottoman–Venetian Wars
Republic of Venice nobility